Tapa cloth (or simply tapa) is a barkcloth made in the islands of the Pacific Ocean, primarily in Tonga, Samoa and Fiji, but as far afield as Niue, Cook Islands, Futuna, Solomon Islands, Java, New Zealand, Vanuatu, Papua New Guinea and Hawaii (where it is called kapa). In French Polynesia it has nearly disappeared, except for some villages in the Marquesas.

General

The cloth is known by a number of local names although the term tapa is international and understood throughout the islands that use the cloth. The word tapa is from Tahiti and the Cook Islands, where Captain Cook was the first European to collect it and introduce it to the rest of the world. In Tonga, tapa is known as ngatu, and here it is of great social importance to the islanders, often being given as gifts. In Samoa, the same cloth is called siapo, and in Niue it is hiapo. In Hawaii, it is known as kapa. In Rotuma, a Polynesian island in the Fiji group, it is called ‘uha and in other Fiji islands it is called masi. In the Pitcairn islands it was called ahu, and in New Zealand as aute. It is also known as tapia.

All these words give some clue to the origin. Masi could mean the (bark of the) dye-fig (Ficus tinctoria), endemic to Oceania, and probably the one originally used to make tapa. Somewhere in history, during the voyages of migration the hiapo or siapo was introduced from Southeast Asia, the paper mulberry tree (Broussonetia papyrifera). The bark of this tree is much better to use, and put the use of the dye-fig into oblivion. Only its name remained in Fiji. Tapa finally has the meaning of border or strip. It seems likely that before the glueing process became common to make large sheets (see below) only narrow strips were produced.

Tapa can be decorated by rubbing, stamping, stencilling, smoking (Fiji: "masi Kuvui") or dyeing. The patterns of Tongan, Samoan, and Fijian tapa usually form a grid of squares, each of which contains geometric patterns with repeated motifs such as fish and plants, for example four stylised leaves forming a diagonal cross. Traditional dyes are usually black and rust-brown, although other colours are known.

In former times the cloth was primarily used for clothing, but now cotton and other textiles have replaced it. The major problem with tapa clothing is that the tissue loses its strength when wet and falls apart. However, it was better than grass-skirts, which usually are either heavier and harder or easily blown apart, but on the low coral atolls where the mulberry does not grow, people had no choice. It is also labour-intensive to manufacture. Tapa cloth was made by both the men and women in ancient times. An example is the Hawaiian men, who also made their own weapons.

Nowadays tapa is often worn on formal occasions such as weddings. Another use is as a blanket at night or for room dividers. It is highly prized for its decorative value and is often found hung on walls as decoration. In Tonga a family is considered poor, no matter how much money they have, if they do not have any tapa in stock at home to donate at life events like marriages, funerals and so forth. If the tapa was donated to them by a chief or even the royal family, it is more valuable. It has been used in ceremonial masks in Papua New Guinea and the Cook Islands (Mangian masks). It was used to wrap sacred objects, e.g., "God staffs" in the Cook Islands.

In New Zealand, presumably early Māori settlers created clothing from the Broussonetia papyrifera trees that were brought to the islands to be cultivated, however no archaeological evidence of this exists. The New Zealand climate was not suited to cultivate large amounts of tapa cloth, so early Māori adopted the use of harakeke (Phormium tenax, or New Zealand flax) instead. By the 1770s, the primary use of tapa cloth was to create a soft, white cloth used for fillets or in ear piercings by high status men, however barkcloth textiles disappeared from use in the early 19th Century, coinciding with the tree's disappearance from New Zealand.

Fabrication

The following describes the fabrication of Tapa cloth in Tonga, where it is still part of daily life. There may be small or large differences for other locations.

In Tonga hiapo is the name given to the paper mulberry tree. It is not usually grown in whole plantations, but portions of a yam or other vegetable garden are often set aside for it. They are cut and brought home where the first task is to strip the bark from the trees. The strips are about hand wide and person long. The wood left-over is named mokofute. The bark consists of two layers; the outer bark is scraped or split off from the inner bark. This work is called haalo. The outer bark is discarded; the inner bark, named tutu or loututu, is left-over. It is dried in the sun before being soaked.

After this, the bark is beaten on a wooden tutua anvil using wooden mallets called ike. In the beating the bark is made thinner and spread out to a width of about 25 cm. This phase of the work is called tutu (or tutua). The mallets are flat on one side and have coarse and fine grooves on the other sides. First the coarse sides are used and, towards the end of the work, the flat side (tā-tua).

The continuous "thonk" beats of the tapa mallet is a normal sound in Tongan villages. If several women work together they can make a concert out of it. In that case there might be one who tukipotu, beats the end of the tutua to set the rhythm.

When the strips are thin enough, several are taken and beaten together into a large sheet. Some starch from the kumala, or manioke may be rubbed on places which are unwilling to stick. This part of the work is called opoopo, the glue is called tou and the resulting sheet of tapa is called fetaaki. It then consists of two layers of strips in perpendicular direction, the upper one called lauolunga and the lower one laulalo.

A knife or sharp shell, named mutu, is used to trim the edges, and the pieces fallen off in this process are called papanaki. When the white fetaaki is smoked brown, it is called sala.

Often the women of a whole village work together on a huge sheet of tapa. A donation is made to the church or their chief at an important occasion. Such sheets are about 3 m wide and 15 or 30 m, or sometimes even 60 m long. The 15 meter pieces are called launima (meaning five-sheet, because the sheet is five squares), and the 30 m pieces are called lautefuhi.

Ratzel (1896) described the fabrication of tapa as follows:

A circular cut is made with a shell in the bark above the root of the tree; the tree is broken off, and in a few days, when the stem is half-dry, the bark and bast are separated from it. The bast is then cleaned and macerated in water, after which it is beaten with the ribbed club on a wooden block. This beating enlivens a village in Tonga as threshing does in Europe. In half an hour the piece will have changed in shape from a strip almost to a square. The edges are snipped with shells, and a large number of the pieces are drawn separately over a semi-cylindrical wooden stamp, on which the pattern, worked in coco-fibre, is stretched and smeared with a fluid at once adhesive and colouring. On each a second and third layer is placed; and the piece, three layers thick, is coloured more strongly in the parts which are thrown into relief by the inequalities of the bed. Others are annexed to it both at the side and the end, until pieces a yard wide, and 20 to 25 yards long, are produced.
— Friedrich Ratzel, (1896)

Painting
The fetaaki is almost always painted. It then becomes ngatu, the Tongan word for the final product. The painting is done over the whole length, but only the central 2.5 metre in the width direction. On both sides there is an unpainted border of about 20 cm wide, which is called the tapa (in Tonga). To paint it, the sheets are put over a huge wooden drum covered with stencils or kupesi (upeti in Samoa). These stencils are made from coconut front midribs (or any other sticks of a few millimeter thick) and made in the pattern which will be used. There are a handful of standard kupesi designs, like the 'pine road' (the road from the palace to the royal cemetery), or the 'shield of Tonga', or the 'lion' (the king), or the 'dove' (the king as ruler), and more abstract figures like the 'Manulua' (two birds).

The tapa sheet is put over the drum and the women rub with force a dabber with some brown paint (made from the koka tree (Bischofia javanica)) over the sheet. This work is called tatai. Where they rub over a rib of the kupesi more paint will stick to that position while very little will stick elsewhere. In this way the basic pattern is put on the sheet. Once a part is done, they lift up the sheet and proceed to the next strip and so forth. The women will accentuate the faintly visible marks with some more generous paint, this time made from the tongo, the mangrove (Rhizophora mangle). Both koka and tongo paint are always brown, but the latter is much darker. Black is not used in Tonga, although it is characteristic for Fiji.

It is customary that during the paint process lines are drawn on the ngatu along the width every 45 cm or more. The kupesi too are made to the size that they will fit in the divisions thus made. Such a division is known as langanga and they are numbered (on the blank tapa) from one to as many as needed for the whole length. When a smaller piece of ngatu is needed, the sheet is cut along a langanga division. A 4 to 6 langanga piece is called folaosi. An 8-piece is fātuua, while a 10 langanga piece of ngatu is known as toka hongofulu. Less common are the double fātuua, named fātufā or double of that again, the fātuvalu.

These are the traditional ngatu, as evidenced by the extensive vocabulary used (still many more terms exist). Nowadays for the tourist trade other sizes and designs can be made as well.

Gallery

Notable tapa craftspeople
 Mauatua
 Teraura

See also
 Barkcloth
 I-sala, Fijian barkcloth headscarves
 Lacebark
 Lava-lava

Citations

General sources 
 Pule, J and Thomas, N. Hiapo: past and present in Niuean Barkcloth Dunedin, University of Otago Press, 2005.
 Arkinstall, Patricia Lorraine, “A study of bark cloth from Hawaii, Samoa, Tonga and Fiji: An exploration of the regional development of distinctive styles of bark cloth and its relationship to other cultural factors”, Ithaca, N.Y., 1966.
 Brigham, William Tufts, “Ka hana kapa, making of bark-cloth in Hawaii”, Honolulu, Bishop Museum Press, 1911.
I.F. Helu; Critical essays: Cultural perspectives from the Southseas; 1999
 Kaeppler, Adrienne Lois, “The fabrics of Hawaii (bark cloth)”, Leigh-on-Sea, F. Lewis, 1975.
 Leonard, Anne, and Terrell, John, "Patterns of Paradise: The styles and significance of bark cloth around the world", Field Museum of Natural History, Chicago USA, 1980.
 Neich, Roger and Pendergrast, Mick, "Pacific Tapa", University of Hawai'i Press, Honolulu, 1997.
 Winter, Joan G., "Talking Tapa: Pasifika Bark Cloth in Queensland", Keeaira Press, Southport QLD, 2009.
 Aldridge, Richard and Hamson, Michael, "Art of the Massim & Collingwood Bay", Michael Hamson, Palos Verdes, CA, 2009.
 Meyer, Anthony J. P., "Les Tapa funéraires des Nakanai de Nouvelle-Bretagne (The funerary tapa-cloths of the Nakanai from New Britain)", Series: Océanie-Oceania No. 11.", Galerie Meyer, Paris 1992
 Kooijman, Simon, "Ornamented bark-cloth in Indonesia", Series: Mededelingen van het Rijksmuseum voor Volkenkunde, Leiden, No. 16. Leiden, E. J. Brill, 1963.
 Meurant, Georges, and Thompson, Robert Farris, "Mbuti Design: Paintings by Pygmy Women of the Ituri Forest", Thames & Hudson, 1996.
 Wright, Margot, "Barkcloth: Aspects of Preparation, Use, Deterioration, Conservation and Display (Conservators of Ethnographic Artefacts)", Archetype Books, 2001.
 Richards, Rhys, "Not Quite Extinct: Melanesian Barkcloth ('Tapa') from Western Solomon Islands", Paremata Press, 2005.
 Goldman, Irving, "The Cubeo: Indians of the Northwest Amazon", University of Illinois Press, 1979.
 Arbeit, Wendy, "Tapa in Tonga", University of Hawaii Press, Honolulu, 1995.

External links
Bark Cloth − Then and Now, Quilters' Muse Virtual Museum
Bark Cloth - Tapa - Mats, The History of Mankind - Ratzel
Bark Cloth, Kew Gardens webpage
Fijian masi-making
Tapa in Tonga, New Zealand Ministry of Pacific Island Affairs
Tapa in the collection of the Museum of New Zealand Te Papa Tongarewa 
Tapa Cloth as artistic media
Tapa Samples from Oro Province—Papua New Guinea
TAPA Unwrapping Polynesian Barkcloth, Eskenazi Museum of Art, Indiana University
 

History of Oceanian clothing
Indigenous textiles
Nonwoven fabrics
Polynesian clothing
Polynesian culture
Samoan words and phrases
Tongan culture
Fiber plants